Treasure Falls is a waterfall in the San Juan Mountains, within Mineral County, Colorado, United States. The falls are named after a local legend about "a treasure of gold" buried in the mountain that the falls plunge from.

Access

There is a trailhead off Highway 160. A switchback trail will take hikers closer to the plunge base, called the "Misty Deck" where hikers can view and feel the spray of the falls.

Gallery

See also

 Waterfalls of Colorado

References

External links

Waterfalls of Colorado
Plunge waterfalls
Landforms of Mineral County, Colorado
Rio Grande National Forest
San Juan Mountains (Colorado)